Sri Lanka competed at the 2020 Summer Olympics in Tokyo. Originally scheduled to take place from 24 July to 9 August 2020, the Games were postponed to 23 July to 8 August 2021, because of the COVID-19 pandemic. It was the nation's eighteenth appearance at the Summer Olympics, with the exception of the 1976 Summer Olympics in Montreal. Seven of the nation's previous Olympic appearances were under the name Ceylon.

On 4 July 2021, judoka Chamara Dharmawardana and artistic gymnast Milka Gehani were announced as Sri Lanka's flag-bearers during the opening ceremony. Yupun Abeykoon is the flag-bearer for the closing ceremony.

The Sri Lankan team of nine athletes (four men and five women) competed in seven sports along with 17 officials and coaches was announced on July 6, 2021. The country made its debut in the sports of artistic gymnastics and equestrian.

None of the athletes were able to advance to the next rounds in their events and Sri Lanka ended the Tokyo Olympics without a medal.

Competitors
The following is the list of number of competitors in the Games.

Athletics

Sri Lanka entered two athletes. One Sri Lankan athlete, Yupun Abeykoon achieved the entry standard through the world ranking, while Nimali Liyanarachchi was awarded a universality spot.

Track & road events

Badminton

Sri Lanka received an invitation from the Tripartite Commission to send Niluka Karunaratne in the men's singles, to his third straight Olympics.

Equestrian

For the first time in history, Sri Lanka entered one jumping rider into the Olympic equestrian competition, by finishing in the top two of the individual FEI Olympic Rankings for Group G (Southeast Asia and Oceania). Mathilda Karlsson initially had a part of her qualifying points removed, following an administrative error from the FEI; however, the decision on points removal was subsequently overturned by the Court of Arbitration for Sport.

Jumping

Gymnastics

Artistic
With the cancellation of the 2021 Asian Championships in Hangzhou, China, Milka Gehani secured a spot as the highest-ranked gymnast from Asia at the 2019 World Artistic Gymnastics Championships in Stuttgart, Germany not already qualified.

Women

Judo
 
Sri Lanka received an invitation from the Tripartite Commission to send Chamara Dharmawardana in the men's lightweight category (73 kg).

Shooting

Sri Lanka received an invitation from the Tripartite Commission to send a women's rifle shooter to the Olympics, as long as the minimum qualifying score (MQS) was fulfilled by June 5, 2021.

Swimming

Sri Lanka received two universality invitations from FINA to send two top-ranked swimmers (one per gender in their respective individual events to the Olympics, based on the FINA Points System of June 28, 2021.

See also
Sri Lanka at the 2018 Commonwealth Games
Sri Lanka at the 2018 Asian Games
Sri Lanka at the 2020 Summer Paralympics

References

Nations at the 2020 Summer Olympics
2020
2021 in Sri Lankan sport